Lake Skadar also called Lake Scutari, Lake Shkodër and Lake Shkodra lies on the border of Albania and Montenegro, and is the largest lake in Southern Europe. It is named after the city of Shkodër in northern Albania ( or Shkodra). It is a karst lake.

The Montenegrin section of the lake and surrounding land has been designated as a national park, while the Albanian section is a nature reserve and a ramsar site.

Geography 

Lake Skadar itself is located on the western Balkan

The lake is located in the border area between Albania and Montenegro, the Montenegrin share of the area of the lake is slightly larger than the Albanian.

The Bojana River connects the lake with the Adriatic Sea, and the Drin River provides a link with the Ohrid Lake. The largest inflow is from the Morača, which provides about 62% of the lake's water.

There are additionally some fresh water sources at the lake bottom. A characteristic feature of Lake Skadar's water balance is the high inflow from a number of temporary and permanent karstic springs, some of which are sublacustrine in cryptodepressians (so-called ‘oko’). The Southern and southwestern sides of the lake are rocky, barren and steep, having bays in which the sublacustrine springs, are usually to be found. On the northern side there is an enormous inundated area, the boundaries of which change as water levels fluctuate.

Some small islands like Beška, with two churches on it and Grmožur, a former fortress and prison can be found on the southwestern side of the lake.

The climate type is hot-summer Mediterranean climate with dry summers (Csa), under Köppen climate classification.

The Montenegrin part of the lake and its surrounding area were declared a national park in 1983. The Albanian part has been designated as a Managed Nature Reserve. In 1996, by Ramsar Convention on Wetlands, it was included in the Ramsar list of wetlands of international importance.

Geology
Lake Skadar is presumably an ancient lake, although it is a relatively young ancient lake.

Most authors agree that the Lake Skadar basin is of tectonic origin which had been formed due to the complex folding and faulting within north eastern wing of Old Montenegro anticlynorium (High Karst Zone). These movements took place during the Cenozoic period. The Lake basin has been formed as the result of sinking of blocks in the Neogene period or even in Paleogene. In the Miocene and the Pliocene marine conditions prevailed in the Zeta Plain, which was sunk at the beginning of the upper Miocene, and that the sea inundated this plain up to Podgorica during the Pliocene. Radoman (1985) pointed out that sea must have destroyed all the freshwater populations on this plane and in the Lake Skadar area. The connection of Lake Skadar with the sea was interrupted during the younger Pliocene. The question of the origin of its water is of particular interest for biologists as these waters may have provided its first species and been the basis for its present high degree of endemism.

Fauna
The Lake Skadar system is a well-known hotspot of freshwater biodiversity and harbors a highly diverse mollusc fauna.

Lake Skadar is one of the largest bird reserves in Europe, having 270 bird species, among which are some of the last pelicans in Europe, and thus popular with birders. The lake also contains habitats of seagulls and herons.

It is abundant in fish, especially in carp, bleak and eel. Of the 34 native fish species, 7 are endemic to Lake Skadar.

At the scale of Lake Skadar, about 31% of freshwater snails (12 out of 39 species sampled in the lake) are endemic. At the scale of the Lake Skadar basin, 38% (19 species) of the total freshwater gastropod fauna appear to be endemic. There were reliably recorded 50 species of freshwater snails from the Lake Skadar basin. The index of freshwater gastropod endemism is 0.478. With this relatively high value, Lake Skadar exceeds such famous lakes as Lake Malawi and Lake Titicaca. The Lake Skadar is inhabited by five species of Bithynia and it is a hot spot of Bithynia evolution.

There are 17 amphipod species for the Lake Skadar watershed, 10 of them being endemic (mainly from the subterranean habitat).

The small range of many endemic species living in the Lake Skadar system together with ever increasing human pressure make its fauna particularly vulnerable. This becomes even more important in light of ongoing eutrophication, water pollution and sand and gravel exploration activities in the lake and its basin. Research of the phytoplankton community and chlorophyllbased trophic state indices show that the lake is on a betamesosaprobic level of saprobity, which means moderately polluted with organic compounds. Effects of human-induced environmental changes are especially evident for sublacustrine springs, with eutrophication and using for water supplying (e.g., sublacustrine spring Karuč) being the most serious threats.

The 2011 IUCN Red List of Threatened Species includes 21 endemic species from the Lake Skadar basin.

Cultural impact
Radio Skadar, a radio station in Montenegro, based in Podgorica is named after Lake Skadar.

See also

Shaqari Island

References

 

Important Bird Areas of Albania
National parks of Montenegro
Skadar
Skadar
Protected areas established in 1983
Albania–Montenegro border
Skadar
Ramsar sites in Albania
Ramsar sites in Montenegro
Cetinje Municipality
Podgorica Municipality
LSkadar
 
Karst lakes